The World of the Married is a 2020 South Korean television series starring Kim Hee-ae, Park Hae-joon, and Han So-hee. Based on BBC One's drama series Doctor Foster written by Mike Bartlett, it tells a story of a married couple whose betrayal of one another leads to a whirlwind of revenge, grief, forgiveness and healing. It aired on JTBC on Fridays and Saturdays from March 27 to May 16, 2020.

The series is the highest-rated drama in Korean cable television history, overtaking Sky Castle with its final episode reaching a nationwide rating of 28.371%. It also recorded the highest average rating for a drama on cable television, with an average rating of 18.829%. Although the series was criticized for its portrayal of sex and violence, it received critical acclaim for its screenplay, direction and acting performances, with Mo Wan-il winning Best Director and Kim Hee-ae winning Best Actress at the 56th Baeksang Arts Awards.

Synopsis 

Ji Seon-u (Kim Hee-ae), a revered family medicine doctor and associate director at Family Love Hospital in Gosan, South Korea, is married to an aspiring director Lee Tae-oh (Park Hae-joon), with whom she has a son, Lee Jun-yeong (Jeon Jin-seo). Seon-u thinks her family is perfect until she finds out that Tae-oh is having an affair with another woman named Yeo Da-kyung (Han So-hee).

Cast and characters 

 Kim Hee-ae as Ji Seon-u
 Park Hae-joon as Lee Tae-oh
 Han So-hee as Yeo Da-kyung
 Park Sun-young as Go Ye-rim 
 Kim Young-min as Son Je-hyuk
 Chae Gook-hee as Seol Myung-suk
 Lee Geung-young as Yeo Byung-gyu
 Kim Sun-kyung as Uhm Hyo-jung
 Jeon Jin-seo as Lee Jun-yeong
 Shim Eun-woo as Min Hyun-seo
 Jung Jae-soon as Bae Jung-shim
 Lee Hak-joo as Park In-Gyu
 Lee Moo-saeng as Kim Yoon-gi
 Seo Yi-sook as Chairman Choi's wife

Episodes

Production

Development and filming

In 2018, JTBC Studios acquired the rights to remake the scripted format of Drama Republic's series Doctor Foster from BBC Studios. Kang Eun-kyung, who wrote popular TV series such as King of Baking, Kim Takgu (2010) and Dr. Romantic (2016–2020), served as the creator. Gaemi (Kang Dong-yoon), who previously worked on the soundtracks of popular series such as Descendants of the Sun (2016) and When the Camellia Blooms (2019), took charge of the music production.

The series was directed by Mo Wan-il of the 2018 romance-thriller series Misty. In response to questions about the difference between the series and the British original, Mo said, "While the original is focused more on the main character, in adapting the story for the Korean series, we wanted to portray a whirlwind of emotions to rage around the main character and the people around her". Mo then emphasized that unlike the original series, The World of the Married does not just focus on one person but also focuses on the relationships in which the main female character, Ji Seon-u, is involved with.

The first script-reading was held on September 30, 2019. The primary filming location was in Chuncheon, Gangwon Province, which is the fictional city of Gosan in the series. The Gosan Station featured in the series was shot at Gangneung Station. Much of the filming also took place at an American village called Humphreys Landing, which is Gosan Premium Townhouse Complex in the series, in Pyeongtaek, Gyeonggi Province. The crew wrapped up the last shoot on May 12, 2020.

Casting
Kim Hee-ae and Park Hae-joon were confirmed to star in the drama series on September 30, 2019. Park Hae-joon initially said no to the series saying that, "I wanted to do it, but I was worried about whether I could do it well". Speaking to GQ Korea, he revealed that he was hesitant due to the strong extreme traits of the male lead character who cheats on his wife. He also stated that he did not feel confident to give justice to the role of a cheating husband with the needed intensity as he did not have much time to prepare. However, he eventually accepted the offer after talking to a friend.

Subsequently, Han So-hee and Lee Moo-saeng were confirmed to join the cast on October 7 and on December 4, 2019, respectively.

Content rating
The first to the sixth episodes were fixed at late-night hours so that only those aged 19 or older can watch them under the Juvenile Protection Act. The series's scenes were deemed unfit to be shown to those who are under 19. For the seventh and eighth episodes, they were lowered to allow those aged 15 or older to watch them. However, after facing criticisms from a portion of viewers for including some aggressive scenes in Episode 7 and Episode 8, the rating was altered back to 19 or older starting from the ninth episode.

Broadcast and home video 
The World of the Married was originally broadcast on JTBC on Fridays and Saturdays from March 27 to May 16, 2020. It is available for streaming online via Viu in Hong Kong, Singapore, Malaysia, Thailand, Indonesia, and Myanmar. The series became the most-watched drama on the streaming platform, being watched by more than 55% of Viu's audience in Asia since the beginning of its screening. It is also available to stream on Iflix in Southeast Asia with subtitles in Indonesian, English, Malay and Vietnamese. The drama is also available on Netflix and Disney+ in selected territories.

Original soundtrack 

The series's soundtrack is compiled in a two-part album released on May 25, 2020. The album contains 6 original soundtracks and 28 musical scores. The following lists are the track listings for the online streaming of the album.

Reception

Commercial performance 
The series emerged as the most-talked-about series in South Korea in the first half of 2020. According to big data analytics firm Good Data Corporation, the series ranked first place in the series category with an overwhelming score, achieving an "all-kill" record for its huge online presence in terms of news articles and comments, video views, and blog and community posts and comments. Additionally, various parodies were made about the series by other entertainment programs, Korean celebrities and the online community. As a result, the keyword 'adultery', which was considered to be a serious and rarely-discussed topic on Korean broadcasting channels, went beyond the series and became a widely discussed topic on social media.

Kim's fashion and styling in the series also received attention from the public by consistently rising to be the top real-time search term after an episode was aired. The fashion, dubbed as "Kim Hee-ae Fashion" and "Ji Seon-u Style", boosted a style that mixes inner outfit, outer outfit and shoes of similar colors. In addition, premium golf brand St Andrews experienced an unexpected huge burst in sales by about 4,000% YOY in the first two weeks of May after Han So-hee wore its golf apparel in the series. The clothes and hats that Han wore were all sold out in stores across the country for two days after the episode was aired. Emons Furniture also saw its sales volume almost doubled after its products appeared in the series.

Critical response
The series was praised by critics for steering away from the typical revenge storyline and instead focuses on the complex psychology of the characters. Series critic Gong Hee-jung said that it is different from other dramas about conflicts between couples in that it "closely depicted the psychology of the characters in each situation". Edmund Lee of South China Morning Post gave the drama series 4.5 out of 5 stars and called it "one of the best Korean dramas in years" due to its "masterfully scripted story of infidelity and revenge" and "vividly caustic dialogue, melancholic plot twists and some wonderfully convincing performances". Jung Deok-hyun, a pop culture critic, called the series "a great significance", as there have been no Korean television show restricted to viewers over 19 that achieved the same success as The World of the Married and said that the series opened the door for other shows to contain more mature content. According to The Guardian, the drama was praised for its realism with its portrayal of life after divorce and how it broke the way how men are usually portrayed in Korean dramas, as well as featuring plot lines implying issues that were not featured in the original series such as dating violence and the widening social inequality and gender inequality in the Korean society. Storylines about gender discrimination in the workplace were shared broadly on the internet and further prompted many women to share about their negative experiences with male colleagues.

The production team also received positive reviews for their willingness to push the boundaries not only with the story but with their unique filming approach. According to EDaily, the series's success was led by director Mo Wan-il, whose detailed and sensuous directing that focused on the emotions and psychology of the characters differentiated the series from other shows about adultery. Additionally, the success of the series was attributed to the solid performances from the cast, particularly Kim Hee-ae who received rave reviews for her intense and explosive portrayal of Ji Seon-u throughout the series.

Meanwhile, culture critic Hwang Jin-mi criticized the series questioning if the portrayal of the main character's fear of being a divorcee fits with society today.

Controversies
The drama series sparked viewer criticisms for a violent scene featured in Episode 8, which was edited from the perpetrator's view similar to what it is in virtual reality. The unprecedented "detailed first-person perspective" of the scene was said to be too aggressive for television and could possibly be a trauma trigger for some viewers. On the other hand, there were viewers who found the "first-person perspective" camerawork to be refreshing and experimental in the Korean drama scene as it added to the overall tension of the moment.

There was also a controversial scene that was deemed to be a "commercialization of sex" in the drama when a female character asked for a luxury bag in return for sexual favours. It was criticized for the manner in which it depicts the theme. After the controversies, the Korea Communications Standards Commission suggested that new measures had to be take to curb inappropriate content on South Korean television, as such plot points promote violence and deliver negative messages about women. Committee member Park Sang-soo claimed that "the scene of the assault is cruel" and that "the scene of the female character demanding the luxury bag shows a disgusting view of women". However, there were differing opinions saying that television should be more bold with more mature content as such situations are realistic. In a meeting held on 27 May 2020, the broadcasting review subcommittee of the Korea Communications Standards Commission decided on the administrative guidance "recommendation" for the drama due to its controversial scenes and the re-broadcasting of the same content during the youth viewing protection hours. As a result, the series received a warning from the broadcasting committee, although no penalty was given to JTBC.

Awards and nominations

Viewership 
Although the series airs on JTBC, a cable channel/pay TV which normally has a relatively smaller audience compared to free-to-air TV/public broadcasters (KBS, SBS, MBC and EBS), after only 12 episodes, the drama series became the most-watched series ever in Korean cable television history according to Nielsen Korea, surpassing the previous record of 23.8 percent set by another JTBC's series SKY Castle. This marked the highest viewership by a series episode aired on a local cable channel and the second-highest for all programs aired on cable networks.

Notes

References

External links
  
 
 

2020 South Korean television series debuts
2020 South Korean television series endings
Adultery in television
Doctor Foster
JTBC television dramas
Korean-language television shows
South Korean television series based on British television series
Television series by JTBC Studios
Television series by BBC Studios